Dizi (also Romanized as Dīzī) is a village in Negur Rural District, Dashtiari District, Chabahar County, Sistan and Baluchestan Province, Iran. At the 2006 census, its population was 577, in 116 families.

References 

Populated places in Dashtiari County